Symphony of Shadows is the third studio album by Danish power metal band Seven Thorns.

Track listing

Personnel
Lars Borup - Drums
Gabriel Tuxen - Guitars, backing vocals
Asger  W. Nielsen - Keyboards, backing vocals
Mads Mølbæk - Bass
Björn Asking - Lead vocals

Guest musicians
Alyzee - Female vocals on Beneath a Crescent Moon.
Dr. P - Soprano vocals on Symphony of Shadows.

Production
Tue Madsen - Mixing and mastering

References

2018 albums
Seven Thorns albums
Power metal albums by Danish artists